The Cumberland County Courthouse is a historic building in Crossville, Tennessee. It serves as the courthouse for Cumberland County. It was built with sandstone from the county, and completed in 1905.  It was the third courthouse built for the county, the first one dating back to 1857 and the second one to 1886.

The building was designed by W. Charmberlin and Company, an architectural firm from Birmingham, Alabama. It has been listed on the National Register of Historic Places since June 17, 1980.

References

National Register of Historic Places in Cumberland County, Tennessee
Government buildings completed in 1886
County courthouses in Tennessee